The following is a complete list of people who received an electoral vote in a United States presidential election. For all elections past 1804, "P" denotes a presidential vote, and "VP" denotes a vice presidential vote. Bold entries are successful candidates; Italicized entries are runners-up who became vice president under the original system (1788-1800).

This list includes eleven women, nine of whom received vice presidential votes: the first was Tonie Nathan who in 1972 received one vote from a faithless elector. This was followed by Geraldine Ferraro in 1984 and Sarah Palin in 2008. Maria Cantwell, Susan Collins, Carly Fiorina and Winona LaDuke all received a single faithless vote for vice president in 2016, and in that same election Elizabeth Warren received two. Hillary Clinton and Faith Spotted Eagle in 2016 are the only women to receive electoral votes for president; Spotted Eagle's single vote was from a faithless elector, and she was also the first Native American to receive an electoral vote for president. Kamala Harris became the first female vice president after the 2020 election.

17 electors did not cast votes:
 Two Maryland electors and two Virginia electors in 1788.
 Two Maryland electors and one Vermont elector in 1792.
 A Kentucky elector in 1808.
 An Ohio elector in 1812.
 Three Maryland electors and one Delaware elector in 1816.
 Two Maryland electors in 1832.
 A Nevada elector in 1864.
 A Washington, DC elector, Barbara Lett-Simmons, in 2000.

There are also two cases where votes were rejected by Congress:
 In 1864, 17 electoral votes from Louisiana and Tennessee (received by Abraham Lincoln) were rejected due to issues relating to the American Civil War.
 In 1872:
 14 votes from Arkansas and Louisiana (received by Ulysses S. Grant) were rejected due to various irregularities, including allegations of electoral fraud.
 Three electoral votes from Georgia (received by Horace Greeley) were rejected as the votes were cast after Greeley's death.

See also
List of United States presidential candidates by number of votes received

Lists of candidates for President of the United States
Presidential elections in the United States